XII Riigikogu was the twelfth legislature of the Estonian Parliament (Riigikogu). The legislature was elected after 2011 election.

Election results

Officers
Speaker of the Riigikogu: Ene Ergma and later Eiki Nestor.

List of members of the Riigikogu

References

Riigikogu